The 1979 Dutch TT was the seventh round of the 1979 Grand Prix motorcycle racing season. It took place on the weekend of 21–23 June 1979 at the TT Circuit Assen located in Assen, Netherlands.

Classification

500 cc

References

Dutch TT
Dutch
Tourist Trophy